On 17 October 1961, five African-American basketball players of the Boston Celtics and two from the St. Louis Hawks boycotted a National Basketball Association exhibition game between the teams in Lexington, Kentucky, after facing racial discrimination in the city.

Background
Two black players, Sam Jones and Satch Sanders, went to a coffee shop at the Phoenix Hotel on arriving in town, where a waitress refused to serve them. “I’m sorry but we don’t serve Negroes,” NBA champion Boston Celtics were told. Later, Hawks player Cleo Hill was also denied service. The Celtics players informed Bill Russell of this incident, and the three along with K.C. Jones, Al Butler and Hawks players Woody Sauldsberry and Hill decided to leave Kentucky in protest. Coach Red Auerbach argued the players should stay, but ultimately agreed to drive them to the airport. On arriving in Boston, Russell stated to the media: "Negroes are in a  fight for their rights – a fight for survival in a changing world... I am with these Negroes."

See also
Racial segregation in the United States
1965–66 Texas Western Miners men's basketball team
Glory Road, 2006 film about Texas Western's win against Kentucky

References

Boston Celtics
Boycotts of events
Politics and sports
Civil rights movement
Celtics boycott
Celtics boycott
Celtics boycott
Celtics boycott
History of Lexington, Kentucky